Les Retrouvailles is the fifth studio album by French musician Yann Tiersen.  Released in 2005 through Ici, d'ailleurs... record label, it features a number of high-profile guest vocalists, both French and Anglophone alike: Christophe Miossec, Dominique A, Elizabeth Fraser (of the Cocteau Twins), Jane Birkin, and Stuart Staples (of the Tindersticks).  As is customary with his albums, Tiersen showcases his multi-instrumental skills, which on the album encompasses the accordion, piano, mandolin, and harpsichord, among others.

Les Retrouvailles also includes a DVD featuring a short film entitled La Traversée, directed by Aurelie du Boys, which documents the making of the album and incorporates an animated video for the non-album track, "Le Train," and also live versions of a handful of songs.

Track listing
Music and lyrics written by Yann Tiersen, except where noted.

 "Western" - 2:23
 "Kala" (Fraser, Tiersen) - 4:09 (Sung by Elizabeth Fraser)
 "Loin des villes" - 3:19
 "La Veillée" - 3:11
 "Plus d'hiver" - 2:23 (Sung by Jane Birkin)
 "A ceux qui sont malades par mer calme" - 3:30
 "A Secret Place" (Staples, Tiersen) - 3:26 (Sung by Stuart A. Staples)
 "Le Matin" - 1:58
 "Les Enfants" - 2:00
 "Le Jour de l'ouverture" (Ané, Miossec, Tiersen) - 3:38 (Sung by Miossec and Dominique A)
 "La Boulange" - 2:46
 "La Plage" - 1:57
 "Mary" - 3:38 (Sung by Elizabeth Fraser)
 "7:PM" - 2:40
 "Les Retrouvailles" - 1:30
 "La Jetée" - 1:05

Personnel
Yann Tiersen – accordion, alto saxophone, banjo, bass, Bontempi, carillon, cello, clavecin, double bass, drums, ebow, Fender Rhodes, guitar, Korg synthesizer, mandolin, marimba, melodica, organ, percussion, piano, toy piano, vibraphone, violone
Elizabeth Fraser - vocals on "Kala" and "Mary"
Jane Birkin - vocals on "Plus d'hiver"
Stuart A. Staples - vocals on "A Secret Place"
Dominique A - vocals on "Le Jour de l'ouverture"
Miossec - vocals on "Le Jour de l'ouverture"
Jean-François Assy - violoncello on "Kala", "La Veillée", "A Secret Place", and "La Boulange"
Orchestre National de Paris on "Kala", "La Veillée", "Le Jour De L'Ouverture", "Mary", and "Les Retrouvailles"
Frederic Dessus - violin on "La Veillée", "Plus d'hiver" and "Mary"
Guillaume Fontanarosa - violin on "La Veillée", "Plus d'hiver" and "Mary"
Bertrand Causse - vertical viola on "La Veillée", "Plus d'hiver", and "Mary"
Anne Causse Biragnet - violoncello on "La Veillée", "Plus d'hiver", and "Mary"
Armelle Legoff - violin on "Plus d'hiver" and "Mary"
Frédéric Haffner - violin on "Plus d'hiver" and "Mary"
Elliott - flute on "Les Enfants"
Ludovic Morillon - drums on "La Boulange"
Christine Ott - ondes Martenot on "La Boulange"

Charts

Certifications

References

2005 albums
Yann Tiersen albums